James Lee Fairbank (March 17, 1881 – December 27, 1955) was an American pitcher in Major League Baseball.

References

External links

1881 births
1955 deaths
Major League Baseball pitchers
Philadelphia Athletics players
Baseball players from New York (state)
Utica Pent-Ups players
Providence Grays (minor league) players
Albany Senators players
Utica Utes players